The International Korfball Federation has 69 members in five (5) continental confederations (Europe, Asia, Africa, Americas and Oceania).

Members by Regions
 

69 Members:

Members

Europe

Asia

Americas

Africa

Oceania

References

Korfball
Korfball associations